Erik Menneskesøn (meaning Erik "Son of Man") is the protagonist in a mythological book series by Danish writer Lars-Henrik Olsen. The series exists in a parallel universe set in present time; the major difference is that the Norse Mythology is real. Common to all the books is that the realm of Heaven (Asgard in this context) is the most used, whereas Earth is roughly mainly used as a dull starting place.

The series consists of the following four books:
 Erik Menneskesøn
 Kampen om Sværdet
 Kvasers Blod
 Gudernes Skæbne

Plot 
Erik Menneskesøn is a 13-year-old retrieved to Asgard to help liberate the goddess of youth/eternal life Idun from the Jotuns. His journey takes him through Asgard, the underworld and the land of the dead Hel as well as Jötunheimr. With him, he has the daughter of Thor; Þruðr(Trud). Erik goes through his quest and he starts to fall in love with Trud, and she with him.
"The Fight Over the Sword" takes place on Laesoe where Erik is on holiday with his girlfriend Marie from his school. Here he finds the sword Gram. The Jotuns are trying to get the sword and Odin comes in disguise to help protect the sword.
In "Kvasers Blood" Erik once again becomes intertwined in the world of the gods. This time, however, it is the Jotuns who wants Erik's assistance. Útgarða-Loki is trying to get Erik to see things from the Jotuns' perspective and together with his daughter, Gunnlöð tries to get skjaldemøden back from the gods.
The last volume, "the fate of the gods", is about Ragnarok, which literally means "Fate of the gods" and is the end of the world. On a holiday in Iceland Erik experiences an earthquake and a flood that strikes him out. When he wakes, he is once more in Asgard. In Asgard, the Jotuns are attacking and everything indicates that Ragnarok is in progress.

Characters in historical novel series